The 3.7 cm Flak 43 was a light anti-aircraft (AA) gun used by Nazi Germany during World War II. It was derived from the  Flak 18/36/37 series of AA guns. It was provided with single- and twin-gun mounts, the latter being designated as the 3.7 cm Flak 43 Zwilling and was in service from 1944 to 1945.

Background and description
Rheinmetall-Borsig redesigned the Flak 36/37 to incorporate the gas-operated breech mechanism of the  MK 103 and to reduce the number of man-hours required to manufacture it from 4320 to 1000. The most obvious change was the adoption of a horizontal feed system from the vertical system of the earlier guns. The feed tray was positioned inside the oversized trunnions at the gun's center of gravity so it could be reloaded without disturbing the gun's aim. These changes significantly lightened the gun and made it faster to traverse and elevate.

Naval use

The  used a version of it on surface ships as the 3.7 cm Flak M43 in its own single- and twin-gun mounts; its Flak LM 44 mount had the guns side-by-side, unlike the Zwilling.

Service
The first Flak 43s were reported in Luftwaffe service in August 1944, 431 single guns and 41 Zwilling mounts. By February 1945, these increased to 1032 single guns and 380 Zwillings.

References

Bibliography

Further reading

External links

3.7 cm Flak 43 in U.S. Ordnance Catalog 

World War II artillery of Germany
World War II anti-aircraft guns
Anti-aircraft guns of Germany
37 mm artillery
Rheinmetall
Weapons and ammunition introduced in 1944